

Elrundie is a suburb in the Northern Territory of Australia located in Darwin about  east of Darwin City overlooking a part of Darwin Harbour known as the East Arm.

Elrundie consists of land associated with a peninsula known as the Elrundie Peninsula and part of the channels of the following waterbodies that bound the peninsula's coastline: the Hudson Creek to the north-west, the Elizabeth River  to the south-west and the Myrmidon Creek to the south-east.

The name is derived from Elrundie Flat, a name which is considered to be of Aboriginal origin and which was first used in 1869 in a document prepared by A.J. Mitchell, a member of the Goyder expedition to the Northern Territory.  The suburb's boundary and name were gazetted on 21 April 2004.

The 2016 Australian census which was conducted in August 2016 reports that Elrundie had no people living within its boundaries.

Elrundie is located within the federal division of Solomon, the territory electoral division of Spillett and part of the unincorporated areas of the Northern Territory.

See also
List of Darwin suburbs

References

Suburbs of Darwin, Northern Territory
Places in the unincorporated areas of the Northern Territory